Rent: Live is a television special that was broadcast by Fox on January 27, 2019. It is a partially live production of the 1996 Tony Award-winning musical Rent, which tells the story of a group of impoverished young artists struggling to survive and create a life in Lower Manhattan's East Village in the thriving days of Bohemian Alphabet City, under the shadow of HIV/AIDS.

Cast and characters

 Jordan Fisher as Mark Cohen
 Brennin Hunt as Roger Davis
 Tinashe as Mimi Marquez
 Brandon Victor Dixon as Tom Collins
 Valentina as Angel Dumott Schunard
 Vanessa Hudgens as Maureen Johnson
 Kiersey Clemons as Joanne Jefferson
 Mario as Benjamin "Benny" Coffin III

Soloists

 Keala Settle as Cy (a gender-flipped version of Paul from the original, also combined with soloist 1), Homeless Person, Vendor, Roger's Mother
Jennifer Leigh Warren as Homeless Woman with Bags, Mrs. Jefferson, Sue, Vendor, Police Officer, Mrs. Cohen
Debra Cardona as Homeless Woman 2, Ali, Vendor, Police Officer, Cook, Angel's Mom, Mimi's Mother
Matt Saldivar as Mr. Grey, Salvation Army Santa, Gordon, Drunk Santa 1, Vendor, Security Guard
Alton Fitzgerald White as Police Officer, Mr. Jefferson, Support Group Member 2, Homeless Man, Vendor, Cook, Drag Queen, The Pastor
J. Elaine Marcos as Police Officer, Pam, Vendor, Homeless Woman 1, Coat Vendor, Server, Alexi Darling, Angel's Sister, Halloween Costume
Bryce Ryness as The Man, Police Officer, Cook Owner, Support Group Member 16
Emerson Collins as Police Officer, Steve, Drunk Santa 2, Junkie, Host, Halloween Costume
Fredric Odgaard
Benjamin Douglas Rivera
Darius Crenshaw

Ensemble

Robert Roldan
Morgan Marcell
Khori Petinaud
Mia DeWeese
Fred Odgaard
Tilly Evans-Krueger

Dancers

Hannahlei Cabanilla
Sasha Dominique Mallory
Ty Wells
Jessica Lee Keller
Lenin Fernandez Jr.
Nick Lanzisera
Benjamin Douglas Rivera

The original Broadway cast, including Daphne Rubin-Vega, Anthony Rapp, Fredi Walker, Adam Pascal, Jesse L. Martin, Taye Diggs, Wilson Jermaine Heredia, Idina Menzel, and Gilles Chiasson  made cameos in the special.

Musical numbers

Act 1

"Tune Up #1" – Mark, Roger
"Voice Mail #1" – Mark's Mom
"Tune Up #2" – Mark, Roger, Collins, Benny
"Rent" – Mark, Roger, Joanne, Benny, Collins, Ensemble
"You Okay, Honey?" – Angel, Collins, Homeless Man
"Tune Up #3" – Mark
"One Song Glory" – Roger
"Light My Candle" – Roger, Mimi
"Today 4 U" – Angel, Collins, Mark, Roger
"You'll See" – Benny, Mark, Roger, Collins, Angel
"Voice Mail #2" – Joanne's Mom, Joanne's Dad
"Tango: Maureen" – Mark, Joanne
"Life Support" – Cy, Gordon, Steve, Ali, Pam, Sue, Angel, Collins, Mark
"Out Tonight" – Mimi
"Another Day" – Roger, Mimi, Ensemble
"Will I?" – Company
"On the Street" – Homeless Man, Carolers, Homeless Woman, Cops, Mark, Collins, Angel
"Santa Fe" – Collins, Angel, Mark
"I'll Cover You" – Collins, Angel
"We're Okay" – Joanne
"Christmas Bells" – Company
"Over the Moon" – Maureen
"La Vie Bohème" – Company
"I Should Tell You" – Mimi, Roger
"La Vie Bohème B" – Company

Act 2

"Seasons of Love" – Company
"Happy New Year" – Mark, Roger, Maureen, Mimi, Joanne
"Voice Mail #3" – Mark's Mom, Alexa Darling
"Happy New Year B" – Mark, Roger, Maureen, Mimi, Joanne, Benny, The Man
"Take Me or Leave Me" – Maureen, Joanne
"Without You" – Mimi, Roger
"Voice Mail #4" – Alexa Darling
"Contact" – Company
"I'll Cover You [Reprise]" – Collins, Cy, Mark, Ensemble
"Halloween" – Mark
"Goodbye Love" – Mark, Roger, Mimi, Joanne, Maureen, Benny, Collins
"What You Own" – Mark, Roger
"Voice Mail #5" – Parents
"Finale" – Homeless People, Mark, Roger, Collins, Maureen, Joanne, Mimi
"Your Eyes" – Roger
"Finale B" – Company
"Seasons of Love (Finale C)" – Company, Original Broadway Cast of Rent

Several of the songs, notably the various "Voice Mails," "Christmas Bells" and "Finale A", were shortened to fit the run time. "Seasons of Love B" was cut entirely.

Production and broadcast
Marc Platt, Adam Siegel, Julie and Al Larson (Jonathan's sister and father, respectively), Vince Totino, Scott Hemming, and Marla Levine are credited as executive producers.

On January 26, 2019, during the Saturday dress rehearsal, Brennin Hunt, who plays Roger, broke his foot. Fox announced in an official statement that despite his injury, the show would air as planned using both pre-recorded footage from a previous dress rehearsal and live footage. On January 27, the show was performed in its entirety with limited physical activity before a studio audience as scheduled, with Hunt performing in a wheelchair. 

The simultaneous telecast consisted almost entirely of the prerecorded dress rehearsal from the prior night; only the final 15 minutes of the program, which consisted of the songs "Finale", "Your Eyes", and "Finale B", as well as an encore performance of "Seasons of Love" featuring the original 1996 Broadway cast, was broadcast live. The choreography of the final act was modified to accommodate Hunt being in a wheelchair.

WNYW technical issues
A technical fault at the start of the show occurred with New York City's Fox flagship station WNYW and its direct fiber connection to cable providers Optimum and Spectrum, resulting in those viewers missing the first five minutes of the special, including all or part the numbers "Tune Up #1," "Voice Mail #1," "Tune Up #2" and "Rent".

Reception

Critical reception
The special received mixed to negative reviews from critics. On Rotten Tomatoes, it holds a 27% approval rating from 22 reviews, with an average score of 5.8/10. The critical consensus reads, "Despite the show's earnest intentions, Rent Live'''s clumsy production and pre-recorded broadcast render it an underwhelming 'live' musical event." On Metacritic, which calculates a weighted average of review scores, the special holds a score of 49 out of 100 based on 12 reviews, indicating a "mixed or average" reception.

Much of the criticism focused on the production's failure to hire understudies for the main cast in reference to Hunt's injury, as well as the decision to broadcast a prerecorded performance for a program marketed as live television. Daniel Fienberg, writing for The Hollywood Reporter, wrote that the network "could have quickly strategized a live concert setting with a limited staging around Hunt and then aired the dress rehearsal at some point during the week." Aisha Harris, reviewing for The New York Times, echoed these sentiments, writing "How do you measure three hours of chaotic visuals and middling audio most of us were never meant to see and hear?", and calling the camerawork "overwrought." 

Extensive edits to profanity and sexual references in the musical's lyrical content, made in order to meet network broadcasting standards, was also the subject of criticism, with Variety critic Caroline Framke questioning if a broadcast network was an appropriate outlet for a production of the show in the first place.

However, the cast's performances (particularly Fisher, Dixon, Tinashe and Hudgens) were generally praised, and the production design of the program was also well received. In a mostly positive review for The A.V. Club'', Caroline Siede wrote that the special "did what these live musicals are supposed to do—reimagine a beloved musical with a new aesthetic, new performers, and new staging choices," and praised the show's finale featuring the 1996 Broadway cast.

Ratings
The telecast received a 1.4 rating among adults 18 to 49 and 3.42 million total viewers, making it the lowest-rated live musical broadcast as of its airdate. In markets where ratings were available segment-by-segment, viewership fell dramatically after the opening segment.

Awards

See also
 2019 in American television
 LGBT culture in New York City

Notes

References

External links
 
 

2019 LGBT-related films
2019 television specials
2010s American television specials
African-American LGBT-related films
American live television shows
English-language television shows
Films set in 1989
Films set in 1990
Films set in Manhattan
Fox television specials
HIV/AIDS in American films
LGBT-related musical films
Musical television films
Musical television specials
LGBT-related television specials